Onychembolus is a genus of South American dwarf spiders that was first described by Alfred Frank Millidge in 1985.

Species
 it contains two species:
Onychembolus anceps Millidge, 1991 – Chile
Onychembolus subalpinus Millidge, 1985 (type) – Chile, Argentina

See also
 List of Linyphiidae species (I–P)

References

Araneomorphae genera
Linyphiidae
Spiders of South America